"Why Don't They Let Us Fall in Love" is a song written by Phil Spector, Ellie Greenwich, and Jeff Barry. It was first recorded by American singer Ronnie Spector, who was credited as Veronica. In 1964, it was released as an A-sided single backed with "Chubby Danny D". It did not chart.

The song was originally intended for the Ronettes, and was recorded at Gold Star Studios in March 1963, but Spector withheld its release for the reason that he did not feel it to be a number-one record. Instead, "Be My Baby" was issued. "Why Don't They Let Us Fall in Love" was not placed on an LP until Phil Spector Wall of Sound Vol. 6 – Rare Masters Vol. 1, a rarities compilation issued in the UK in 1976.

In 1965, the New Orleans pop girl group the Dixie Cups released the single "Gee the Moon Is Shining Bright", an alternate version of the song with slightly reworked lyrics. Their version bubbled under the Hot 100 at number 102. It was the fourth and final single taken from their debut studio album Chapel of Love.  Cash Box described it as "a pulsating, rhythmic pop-blues romancer about a very-much-in-love gal who can’t wait to have some time alone with her fella."

Other versions
 1965 – Sonny & Cher, Look At Us
 2008 – The Morning Benders
 2013 – The Beach Boys, Made in California (recorded July 1980)

References

Sources
 
 
 
 
 
 

1964 singles
1964 songs
Songs written by Phil Spector
Songs written by Jeff Barry
Songs written by Ellie Greenwich
Song recordings produced by Phil Spector
The Ronettes songs
The Dixie Cups songs
The Beach Boys songs
Sonny & Cher songs
Red Bird Records singles